The 2009 Formula Lista Junior season was the tenth Formula Lista Junior season. It began on April 11 at Dijon-Prenois and ended on September 27 at Monza after twelve races. Kevin Giovesi was crowned series champion.

Teams and drivers
 All cars are powered by BMW engines, and Mygale FB02 chassis.

Race calendar and results

Championship standings
Points are awarded as follows:

References

External links
 Official website

Formula Lista Junior
Formula Lista Junior
Lista Junior